Dr. Gibril Ibrahim Mohammed is a Sudanese politician. He is the leader of the Justice and Equality Movement (JEM). He was chosen to replace his brother, Khalil, on 26 January 2012, after Khalil's death in a SAF airstrike in Northern Kordofan in December 2011. He recently allied with SAF.

Biography
Ibrahim was born on 1 January 1955 in al-Tina, North Darfur, in what was then the Anglo-Egyptian colony of Sudan. His father died when he was 4. Ibrahim studied for an undergraduate degree at the University of Khartoum, before leaving Sudan at the age of 25.

Ibrahim was offered a scholarship in Japan, where he spent 7 years, completing his Masters and Doctorate in economics, and becoming a fluent Japanese speaker. Ibrahim later returned to Sudan, before leaving again for Dubai in 2000 due to his opposition to the government. In Dubai he served as the Economic Advisor for JEM for 6 years, before travelling to the United Kingdom in 2006 to serve as JEM's Secretary of Foreign Affairs.

Ibrahim formerly taught as a university professor, and was part of JEM's negotiating team at the failed peace talks in Abuja and Doha.

Ibrahim was Minister of Finance from February 2021 to October 2021. The post was awarded to him as part of a deal to support the military coup of 25th October 2021.

References 

1955 births
Living people
Finance ministers of Sudan
People from North Darfur
People of the War in Darfur
University of Khartoum alumni
Zaghawa people
Sudanese Islamists
Sudanese academics